All Net Resort & Arena is a planned entertainment complex in Las Vegas. A project of businessman and former basketball player Jackie Robinson, the complex will encompass a resort hotel, retail and restaurant space, and a multi-purpose arena with a retractable roof. Its location is set on the Las Vegas Strip at the former site of a Wet 'n Wild waterpark, next to the Sahara Las Vegas in Winchester, Nevada.

Robinson announced the project in December 2013. Designed by the Cuningham Group, it was initially planned to open in December 2016, at a cost of $1.3 billion. However, the project cost has increased several times, and the start of construction has been delayed repeatedly because of difficulty acquiring construction funds. A groundbreaking ceremony was held in October 2014, but preparation work on the site did not begin until early 2017. For the next several years, the property consisted of an excavated hole while Robinson sought financing. In October 2022, some work resumed on the site. The $4.9 billion project is expected to be finished by late 2025. However, the start of construction was delayed to September 2023.

History

Background
The property had previously been the site of the Wet 'n Wild water park, which closed in 2004 for redevelopment. Several projects were proposed for the site over a number of years. Paul Lowden, the owner of the property, had wanted to open a resort known as Palace of the Sea. The project was never built, and Lowden's company, Archon Corporation, agreed to sell the land to Texas developer Christopher Milam in 2006. Milam planned to construct a skyscraper resort on the site known as Crown Las Vegas, but this project was also canceled.

In early 2010, Milam proposed building the Silver State Arena on the former Wet 'n Wild land, which was still owned by Paul and Sue Lowden. The arena would include seating for up to 22,000 people, and Milam sought public funding from Clark County to help finance the project, with a potential opening in 2012. The project would be built by Milam's International Development Management, and would be 85-percent privately financed. It was one of several arenas proposed for the Las Vegas Valley.

Silver State Arena faced opposition from the Clark County Commission, which was hesitant to help fund the project amid financial struggles. To win the support of the commission, Milam sought to attract NBA and NHL teams to the arena. Some nearby residents opposed the project, over concerns about noise, pollution, and increased traffic. MGM Mirage also opposed the project. Milam later proposed an arena for other locations in the Las Vegas Valley, but the project remains unbuilt.

All Net Resort & Arena
On December 23, 2013, businessman Jackie Robinson, a former UNLV student and NBA player, announced plans to build his own sports arena on the former Wet 'n Wild property. The project was tentatively known as All Net Arena & Resort, and he planned to pursue a naming rights deal eventually. The four-level arena would measure , and include seating for 22,800 people. The project would also include a  promenade known as Victory Plaza. Other features would include a 500-suite non-gaming boutique hotel, a restaurant, a nightclub, retail space, a spa, and a wedding chapel. The arena would include a retractable roof, which would allow for a range of indoor and outdoor events. The roof was intended as a main feature for the project. Robinson hoped to attract an NBA team to play at the arena.

The project received a number of skeptics who believed that it would never materialize. Robinson had an option to purchase the property from the Lowdens, or lease it over a 50-year period. He expected to break ground by mid-2014, with the opening scheduled for December 2016. The resort would cost $1.3 billion, including $690 million for the arena. Robinson had funding from a variety of sources, including several banks and the EB-5 program. He had begun planning the project four or five years earlier, but the Great Recession halted his plans. Cuningham Group Architecture was hired to design the project, with the company's Brett Ewing as architect. Comcast Spectacor was chosen to operate the arena.

In August 2014, the Clark County Commission unanimously approved a zoning change that would allow the All Net Resort & Arena to be built, despite opposition from residents of the adjacent Turnberry Place complex. The project was approved to include a 44-story hotel with 500 rooms, and a 16-screen movie theater was added to the plans. At the time, Robinson was working with the Minority Business Development Agency to recruit investors. He hoped to raise $300 million through the EB-5 program.

A groundbreaking ceremony was held for the $1.4 billion project on October 29, 2014. Five months later, Robinson had yet to reach a development agreement with Clark County, which was needed for his lenders to provide financing for the start of construction. He had already received a permit to remove asphalt from the site, and he planned to eventually excavate 50 feet into the ground for parking spaces. He hoped to begin construction later in 2015, with an opening by late 2017. Demolition began on the property shortly thereafter, and Robinson hoped to get the arena finished by 2019.

Legal problems involving a financial partner further delayed the start of construction. SL Hare Capital sued Robinson in 2015, alleging that his group made false statements to gain financing. This led to a countersuit by Robinson's group, alleging that SL Hare had falsely claimed to have secured $300 million for the project. The case was eventually dismissed in January 2017. Two months later, earth moving equipment and dirt haulers were working the site, preparing it for underground parking and utilities. Robinson expected to open the project in December 2019.

In mid-2017, Robinson had a second, 63-story hotel tower added to the plans. It would include 2,000 rooms. The expansion would help ensure the project's success upon opening. He announced shortly thereafter that the project had gained full independent financing. The county approved Robinson's expanded plans in October 2017. The project cost had increased to $2.7 billion, with Credit Suisse as the primary lender. Turnberry Place residents were satisfied with the revised project and the retail space that it would bring. Robinson now expected to begin work on the site by the end of 2017, with completion by mid-2020. The excavation process was expected to take up to eight months. The site consisted of an excavated hole for the next several years while the start of construction faced numerous delays.

In June 2019, Robinson said the project was fully financed and that building designs would take approximately 45 days to receive county approval, while construction would take about three years. In August 2019, Robinson said he was in the final stages of getting his loan for the project, which was expected to cost nearly $3 billion. The project would be financed with money from Qatar, Zürich, and central banks in Europe. Moving the money into the U.S. was a lengthy process. Robinson's group had also invested more than $37 million into the project.

In October 2020, the Clark County Commission granted a final six-month extension for the project to finalize agreements with the county. These included a decommissioning plan in the event that construction stops, and a development agreement, both of which were approved in April 2021. Robinson planned to purchase the property from the Lowdens for $400 million. Construction was scheduled to begin in October 2021, with the project now expected to cost $4 billion. However, these plans would be delayed as well, due to a dispute with Robinson's financiers. A new $4.7 billion funding package, financed by Active Capital Holdings, was announced in February 2022. However, Robinson said the announcement was premature. A new investor and funding package was unveiled in October 2022, a few weeks after some work resumed on the site. The project is expected to cost $4.9 billion, with completion by the end of 2025. In late November 2022, the start of construction on the project was delayed to September 2023.

All Net Resort & Arena is expected to include a 44-story and 63-story hotel, a movie theater, a bowling alley, restaurants, and conference space, among other features.

See also
T-Mobile Arena, the home of the NHL's Vegas Golden Knights

References

External links
 Official website

Proposed skyscrapers in the United States
Proposed indoor arenas in the United States
Proposed buildings and structures in Nevada
Las Vegas Strip